Cecil Reginald Burch, FRS (12 May 1901 – 19 July 1983) was a British physicist and engineer.

He was born in Leeds. He graduated from Gonville and Caius College, Cambridge in 1923 and began research at the  Metropolitan-Vickers company in Trafford Park, Manchester. There he developed 'apiezon' oils which enabled high vacua to be achieved, making possible the coating of astronomical mirrors. In 1933 he was made Fellow of Optics at Imperial College London and in 1935 moved to University of Bristol as a research Fellow in the Department of Physics. There he concentrated on the development of microscopy and telescopy.

He won the 1942 Duddell Medal and Prize and the 1954 Rumford Medal, the latter 'For his distinguished contributions to the technique for the production of high vacua and to the development of the reflecting microscope'.

He was elected a Fellow of the Royal Society in 1944. He married Enid G Morice in 1937.

References

Further reading 
 

1901 births
1983 deaths
People from Leeds
English physicists
Engineers from Yorkshire
Alumni of Gonville and Caius College, Cambridge
Fellows of the Royal Society
Metropolitan-Vickers people